Lillehammer is a railway station located in downtown Lillehammer, Norway, on the Dovre Line. The station was opened in 1894 with the construction of the railway between Hamar Station and Tretten Station. The station got a major overhaul before the 1994 Winter Olympics in Lillehammer.

Lillehammer is served by express trains to Trondheim and is the terminus of the regional trains north to Åndalsnes, and south to Oslo and Drammen. Express trains and regional trains to the north are operated by SJ Norge, regional trains to the south are operated by Vy. Bus service is available by Innlandstrafikk.

On 1 June 1923, the restaurant was taken over by Norsk Spisevognselskap. The facilities were too small, but the company's capital was being used to build Opdal Turisthotell, and funding for expansion of the restaurant in Lillehammer was not available. In October 1937, the restaurant was closed and replaced by a kiosk from April 1938.

References

Railway stations on the Dovre Line
Railway stations in Oppland
Railway stations opened in 1894
1894 establishments in Norway
Buildings and structures in Lillehammer